This is a list of diplomatic missions in Namibia.  At present, the capital city of Windhoek hosts 34 embassies/high commissions.

Diplomatic missions in Windhoek

Embassies/High Commissions 
Entries marked with an asterisk (*) are member-states of the Commonwealth of Nations. As such, their embassies are formally termed as "high commissions".

*

*
*

*

*
*

*

*

*

*

Other missions or delegations 
 (Delegation)

Consulates-General

Oshakati

Rundu

Gallery

Non-resident embassies/high commissions 
Resident in Pretoria, South Africa:

 

Resident in Luanda, Angola:

Resident in other cities:

 (Addis Ababa)
 (Lusaka)
 (New Delhi)
 (Valletta)
 (Lusaka)
 (Nairobi)
 (Kinshasa)
 (Abu Dhabi)
 (Addis Ababa)

Closed missions 
 (closed in 1993)
 (closed in 2018)
 (closed in 2008)

 (closed in 2002)
 (closed in 2006)
 (closed in 1994)

 (closed in 2008)

See also 
 Foreign relations of Namibia
 List of diplomatic missions of Namibia

References

External links 
 Diplomatic missions in Namibia (Outdated)
 namibweb.com

Diplomatic missions
Namibia